Daryl William Mathew Gabriel McInnes (born 10 September 1963) is an Australian film and television actor and writer. He portrayed the role of Matt Tivolli in The Time of Our Lives. He is best known for his roles as Senior Constable Nick Schultz in Blue Heelers and Max Connors in SeaChange.

Early life
McInnes was born in Redcliffe, Queensland. He studied drama at the Western Australian Academy of Performing Arts and graduated in 1988. He was made a fellow of the academy in 2010. He also has a degree and honorary doctorate from Central Queensland University in Rockhampton.

Career

Television
After a recurring role in A Country Practice in 1990, McInnes appeared in series such as Bligh, Ocean Girl, Good Vibrations and Snowy before making his name as Senior Constable Nick Schultz on Blue Heelers in 1993. McInnes starred on the show until 1998, when he left to focus on other work. In 1999, he joined the cast of SeaChange as Max Connors, the new love interest of the main character Laura Gibson (Sigrid Thornton) after Diver Dan (David Wenham) left the series.

In 2001, he starred in an episode of Halifax f.p.. In 2002, McInnes was part of the cast of Marshall Law, which was cancelled after one season; and he returned for several episodes of Blue Heelers in 2004 and 2005. He also had a recurring role as Rosie's sleazy ex Colin in 2003's CrashBurn; and a noted comic turn as Sandy Freckle in two episodes of Kath & Kim, under the pseudonym "Rock Hampton". In 2006 he completed the telemovie Stepfather of the Bride.

McInnes was the first guest host of Let Loose Live on 29 May 2005; the show was axed by the Seven Network after just two weeks. He also appeared as himself on Micallef Tonight on the Nine Network but it was also quickly axed. McInnes lent his voice for the Nine Network factual series The Code: Crime and Justice. He is sometimes credited as "Rock Hampton" (e.g. in Kath & Kim and the 2005 film You and Your Stupid Mate), as a nod to his university time spent in the city of the same name. In 2007 he played the title role in the telemovie Curtin.

In late 2007, he had the lead role in SBS's East West 101. In 2008, he also appeared in Network Ten's telemovie The Informant. He portrayed the historical person, Jack Ford, in the ABC drama Dangerous Remedy (2012).

Film
Early film roles include My Brother Jack (2001), Do Or Die (2001), Dirty Deeds (2002) and the TV Movie The Shark Net (2003).

McInnes featured in the lead role in Look Both Ways (2005), directed by his wife Sarah Watt. Subsequent film roles include in 2006 Irresistible, with Susan Sarandon, and Kokoda, the lead role in the romantic drama Unfinished Sky in 2007, and in 2009 Prime Mover, featuring Andrew S. Gilbert, Ben Mendelsohn and Anthony Hayes, and Sarah Watt's follow-up film My Year Without Sex.

Radio 
In December 2016, McInnes hosted Summer Afternoons across ABC Local Radio.

Writing
McInnes released his first book A Man's Got to Have a Hobby on 1 August 2005. His second book Cricket Kings was released in 2006 and his third, That'd Be Right, in August 2008. His fourth book, The Making of Modern Australia, was released in 2010; it was accompanied by a television documentary series of the same name on the ABC that McInnes narrated. In 2011 he released his fifth book, Worse Things Happen at Sea, co-written by his wife Sarah Watt. In 2014 he released Holidays, a collection of stories loosely based around his and other people's holidays. He wrote a regular column called "William Tells" for The Australian Women's Weekly.

Other
On 16 February 2009, John Faulkner, then Special Minister of State and Cabinet Secretary, appointed McInnes as the new chair of the Advisory Council of the Museum of Australian Democracy at Old Parliament House. McInnes has spoken in many of his media appearances about the museum and its work and the importance of democratic values and civics education. He succeeded Doug Anthony as chair of the council.

Awards
McInnes has won, and been nominated for, several awards including:

Won
 2000 – Most Outstanding Actor at the Logie Awards, for SeaChange
 2002 – Most Outstanding Actor at the Logie Awards, for My Brother Jack
 2008 – Most Outstanding Actor at the Logie Awards, for East West 101
 2008 – Best Actor in a Leading Role at the 50th Australian Film Institute Awards for Unfinished Sky

Nominated
 1997 – Most Outstanding Actor at the Logie Awards, for Blue Heelers
 1998 – Most Outstanding Actor at the Logie Awards, for Blue Heelers
 2001 – Most Outstanding Actor at the Logie Awards, for SeaChange
 2001 – Most Popular Actor at the Logie Awards, for SeaChange
 2001 – Best Actor in a telemovie at the AFI Awards, for My Brother Jack
 2001 – Best Actor in a Television Series at the AFI Awards, for SeaChange
 2004 – Most Outstanding Actor at the Logie Awards, for The Shark Net
 2005 – Best Lead Actor at the AFI Awards, for Look Both Ways
 2008 – Best Lead Actor at the AFI Awards, for East West 101
In 2009 as part of the Q150 celebrations, McInnes was announced as one of the Q150 Icons of Queensland for his role as an "Influential Artist".

Personal life 
He was married to film actor, animator and director Sarah Watt. They had two children, Clem and Stella. Sarah Watt died of cancer in 2011.

Works

Non-fiction

Fiction

References

External links 

1963 births
Australian male film actors
Australian male television actors
Australian non-fiction writers
Best Actor AACTA Award winners
Central Queensland University alumni
Living people
Logie Award winners
Male actors from Queensland
20th-century Australian male actors
21st-century Australian male actors
Audiobook narrators
Western Australian Academy of Performing Arts alumni